Montague is an English surname of Old French origin, a form of Montagu. Notable people with the surname include:

Adrian Montague, British businessman
Alice Montague Warfield Rasin Allen (1869–1929), mother of Wallis, Duchess of Windsor
Sir Anderson Montague-Barlow, 1st Baronet (1868–1951), British barrister and Conservative Party politician
Andrew Jackson Montague (1862–1937), 44th Governor of Virginia 1902–1906 and US Congressman 1912–1937
Andrew Montague (Irish politician), Lord Mayor of Dublin 2011–2012
Ashley Montague (1905–1999), British-American anthropologist and humanist
Ben Montague, British musician and singer-songwriter
Bruce Montague (born 1939), British actor
Charles Edward Montague (1867–1928), British journalist and author
Daniel Montague (1867–1912), United States Navy sailor and recipient of the Medal of Honor (Spanish–American War)
Darrell Montague (born 1987), American mixed martial artist
Diana Montague (born 1953), British opera mezzo-soprano concert singer
Edward Francis "Ed" Montague (1905–1988), US Major League Baseball infielder, later scout
Edward Michael "Ed" Montague (born 1948), US Major League Baseball umpire, son of the baseball player
Edward Wortley Montague (1713–1776), British Member of Parliament, author and traveller
Edwin Montague (1885–1937), British olympic athlete
Edwin Montagu (1879–1924), British Liberal politician
Eleanor Montague (born 1926), American radiologist and educator; member of the Texas Women's Hall of Fame
Evelyn Montague (1900–1948), British olympic athlete and journalist, son of Charles Edward Montague
Fred Montague (1864–1919), British silent film actor
Frederick Montague, 1st Baron Amwell (1876–1966), British Labour Party politician
Henry Montague (1813–1909), Michigan politician
Henry James Montague, stage name for Henry James Mann (1843–1878), British-born American actor
James Montague (1568–1618), English bishop
James "Jimmy" Montague (1873–1941), American journalist, satirist and poet
James Piotr Montague (born 1979), British writer and journalist
John Montague (poet) (1929–2016), US-born Irish poet and writer
John Montague (baseball) (born 1947) US Major League Baseball pitcher
John Montague (golfer) (1903–1972), American golfer
Lee Montague (born 1927), British actor
Margaret Prescott Montague (1878–1955), American short story writer and novelist
Michael Montague, Baron Montague of Oxford (1932–1999), British businessman and politician
Monte Montague, stage name for Walter H. Montague (1891–1959), American film actor
Nathaniel "Magnificent" Montague (born 1928), American R&B disc jockey
Raye Montague (1935-2018), United States Naval Engineer
Read Montague (born 1960), American neuroscientist and popular science author
Richard Montague (1930–1971), American mathematician and philosopher; creator of the "Montague grammar" approach to natural language semantics
Robert Latane Montague (1819–1880), American politician from Virginia who served in the Confederate States Congress
Robert Miller Montague (1899–1958), Lieutenant General in the United States Army
Robert Montague (born 1965), Jamaican politician in the Jamaica Labour Party
Ross Montague (born 1988), British professional footballer
Samuel L. Montague (1829–1869), American politician, active in Cambridge, Massachusetts
Samuel S. Montague (1830–1883), American railway pioneer, responsible for building the western half of the First Transcontinental Railroad
Sarah Montague (born 1966), British radio journalist and Today presenter
Stephen Montague (born 1943), American composer
Walter Humphries Montague (1858–1915), Canadian politician in the Conservative Party of Canada
William Pepperell Montague (1873–1953), American professor of philosophy at Berkeley and Columbia

See also
Montagu (surname)
Montague (given name)